The Art Complex Museum, located in Duxbury, Massachusetts,  south of Boston, serves as a regional arts center and houses the collection of Carl A. Weyerhaeuser (1901-1996) and his wife Edith Greenleaf Weyerhaeuser (1912-2000). The museum is free and open to the public, with support from the Carl A. Weyerhaeuser Family Charitable Trusts and friends of the museum.

The master site planning was done by G2 Collaborative, of Waltham, Massachusetts. Works of sculpture are displayed on the grounds. A Japanese tea hut located on the site is used for formal Japanese tea ceremonies several times per year, which may be observed by the public.

The museum features a gallery for rotating objects from the permanent collection, as well as temporary exhibition spaces that feature painting, sculpture, prints, and craft objects created by contemporary artists. A permanent Founders Room gallery portrays the background of Weyerhaeuser, his collection, and the building of the museum. The building also houses a reference library with over 5,000 publications.

See also
 Ture Bengtz, founding museum director

References

External links
 Official website

Museums in Plymouth County, Massachusetts
Art museums and galleries in Massachusetts
Duxbury, Massachusetts
Art museums established in 1971
1971 establishments in Massachusetts
Asian art museums in the United States